Sir Andrew Wood of Largo (died 1515) was a Scottish sea captain.  Beginning as a merchant in Leith, he was involved in national naval actions and rose to become Lord High Admiral of Scotland.  He was knighted c. 1495.  He may have transported James III across the Firth of Forth to escape the rebels in 1488.

He superintended the rebuilding of Dunbar Castle in 1497.

One of Andrew's sons, John Wood was assassinated in 1570. Andrew Wood is the subject of the historical novel The Admiral by Nigel Tranter.

Naval career

Wood began his naval career as a privateer under James III (reigned 1460–1488), and flourished under James IV (reigned 1488–1513).  
By 1489 he owned the Flower and the Yellow Carvel, both fighting ships, which fought and captured five English ships offshore near Dunbar.  In response, the English launched a larger expedition the following year under Stephen Bull, which attacked Wood's ships in the Firth of Forth.  The fight lasted two days (stopping only at night) and was watched by crowds in Edinburgh.  Wood eventually triumphed, despite being outnumbered in ships and guns, and the English ships were captured. James IV knighted Wood following this battle, and allowed him to impress some of the captured English sailors, who later were put to work build the castle at Largo.

Sir Andrew was the first Captain of James IV's carrack, the Great Michael, which when constructed was the largest ship in Christendom.

Notes

References
Sadler, John; Border Fury: England and Scotland at War 1296-1568, UK: Pearson Education Ltd, 2005 
Tranter, Nigel; The Story of Scotland,, Glasgow: Neil Wilson Publishing, 1993  (first published 1987 by Routledge & Keagan Paul Ltd)
Clan Wood Society

Court of James IV of Scotland
Lord High Admirals of Scotland
Scottish knights
Scottish sailors
Privateers
1515 deaths
Year of birth unknown
16th-century Scottish military personnel